The Sanjō caretaker cabinet is a caretaker Cabinet of Japan led by Sanjō Sanetomi from October 25, 1889 to December 24, 1889.

Cabinet

References 

Cabinet of Japan
1889 establishments in Japan
Cabinets established in 1889
Cabinets disestablished in 1889